The Rochester Broncos were a professional baseball team that played in the American Association for one season in 1890. During their only season in existence, the team finished fifth in the AA with a record of 63–63.

Players

References

External links
Franchise index at Baseball-Reference and Retrosheet

Major League Baseball all-time rosters